Hastings and St Leonards Priory Cricket Club (often shortened down to Hastings Priory) is a cricket club in Hastings, East Sussex. The club is based at Horntye Park, where the 1st XI  and 2nd XI play their home fixtures.

The club has fifteen teams including five men's teams, one ladies' team, seven boys' teams and two girls' teams. The 1st XI and 2nd XI play in the Sussex Cricket League and play their home fixtures at Horntye Park, the 3rd XI and 4th XI play in the East Sussex Cricket League and play their home fixtures at Ark Alexandra Academy.

Teams

Honours
Sussex Cricket League
Premier Division champions 1999, 2002, 2003, 2011

External links 
 

Cricket in East Sussex
English club cricket teams
Hastings